Contemporary Works I is a limited-edition 10-disc CD box set released by Klaus Schulze in 2000 containing new studio material. The CDs are in cardboard sleeves and housed in a wooden box. Two years later Schulze released Contemporary Works II. Six of the discs have been reissued in 2005–2007 as part of the overall reissue program of Schulze back catalog by Revisited Records. Three more have been reissued in 2016–2018 by the label MiG.

Track listing

Disc 1: Vanity of Sounds (reissued in 2005)

Disc 2: The Crime of Suspense (reissued in 2006)

Disc 3: Wahnfried: Trance 4 Motion (reissued in 2018)

Disc 4: U.S.O.: Privée (reissued in 2016)

Disc 5: Klaus Schulze vs. Solar Moon: Docking (reissued in 2017)
{Disc 1}

Disc 5: Klaus Schulze vs. Solar Moon: Docking (reissued in 2017)
{Disc 2}

Disc 6: Ballett 1 (reissued in 2006)

Disc 7: Ballett 2 (reissued in 2006)

Disc 8: Ballett 3 (reissued in 2007)

Disc 9: Ballett 4 (reissued in 2007)

Disc 10: Adds & Edits

See also
Silver Edition
Historic Edition
Jubilee Edition
The Ultimate Edition

References

External links
 Contemporary Works I at the official site of Klaus Schulze
 

Klaus Schulze albums
2000 compilation albums